Pandora is a character in Greek mythology, the first human woman created by the gods.

Pandora may also refer to:

Mythology

 Pandora's box, mythological artifact connected with the myth of Pandora
 Pandora of Thessaly, a character in Greek mythology, daughter of King Deucalion and Pyrrha and granddaughter of the above figure
 Pandora, a character in Greek mythology, the second eldest daughter of King Erechtheus of Athens

Places

Extraterrestrial
 Pandora (moon), one of the satellites of Saturn
 55 Pandora, an asteroid

Terrestrial
 Pandora, Colorado, an unincorporated community in the United States
 Pandora, Ohio, a village in the United States
 Pandora, Pennsylvania, an unincorporated community in the United States
 Pandora, Texas, an unincorporated community in the United States
 Pandora Island, Nunavut, Canada
 Pandora – The World of Avatar, a themed area at Disney's Animal Kingdom, Walt Disney World

 Pandora Reef, Queensland, Australia
 Pandora River, Fiordland, New Zealand
 Pandora's or Pandoras Pass, a mountain pass in New South Wales, Australia

 Pandora, Punjab, a village in Pakistan also known as Pindorah
 Pandora Islet, part of Ducie Island in the South Pacific Ocean
 Pandora mine, which supplied Klondyke mill in the Gwydyr Forest of north Wales in the United Kingdom
 Pandora Spire, a rock Needle in Victoria Land, Antarctica

People
 Pandora (singer), Swedish Eurodance artist
 Pandora, a pseudonym of American clairvoyant Edith Hyde Robbins Macartney
 Pandora, a pseudonym of Polish writer Stefania Zahorska
 Pandora Boxx, American drag queen and comedian
 Pandora Clifford, British actress 
 Pandora Gibson, Bahamian comedian, storyteller and actress
 Pandora Peaks, retired exotic dancer
 Pandora Colin, actress and voice actress

Arts, entertainment, and media

Fictional entities and places
 Pandora (Avatar), a fictional moon, and the setting for James Cameron's Avatar film and video game
 Pandora (comics), a comic book character from Avatar Press
 Pandora (DC Comics), a comic book interpretation of her namesake in Greek mythology
 Pandora (Re:Zero), a character in the light novel series Re:Zero − Starting Life in Another World 
 Pandora, the main character in the anime Because I'm the Goddess
 Pandora, the barren planet of the Borderlands universe
 Pandora, the artificially-created human key to opening Pandora's Box in God of War III
 Pandora, a character in the Guitar Hero series of video games
 Pandora, an antagonist in the anime Futari wa Pretty Cure (originally named Poisony)
 Pandora, a character in the Kid Icarus series of video games
 Pandora, one of the antagonists in the Mega Man ZX series
 Pandora, a fictional planet in the Noon Universe by Soviet authors Arkady and Boris Strugatsky
 Pandora, the sister of the god Hades in the Saint Seiya anime and manga series
 Pandora, a fictional planet created by Frank Herbert, first introduced in The Jesus Incident
 Pandora Braithwaite, a fictional character in the Adrian Mole books
 Pandora Moon, a fictional character in the British drama Skins
 Pandora Pann, a DC Comics character
 Pandora the Brat, a character in the children's series The Electric Company
 Pandora, a character in The Vampire Chronicles novel series
 Pandora, a character in the Gallifrey Doctor Who audio drama series
 Pandora, a character in the Pandora comic strip in the magazine Kerrang!

Film and television
  Pandora (2016 film), a South Korean film
  Pandora (TV series), a 2019 sci-fi television series.
 "Pandora" (Skins episode), an episode of the teen drama Skins
 "Pandora" (Smallville episode), an episode from the 9th season of the superhero series Smallville
 Pandora Film, a German film producer and distributor

Gaming
 Pandora (console), a hand held video game console with open-source software
 Pandora (Interceptor Software), a game publishing label established in 1986
 Pandora, a video game released in 1988 on the Amiga and Atari ST, by Firebird Games
 Pandora: First Contact, a 4X game

Literature
 Pandora (novel), by Anne Rice in The Vampire Chronicles
 Pandora, a novel by Jilly Cooper
 Pandora, a novel by Sylvia Fraser based on her own childhood
 "Pandora", a short story by Henry James, published in 1884
 Pandora, a drama fragment by Johann Wolfgang von Goethe
 Pandora, by Holly Hollander, a novel by Gene Wolfe
 Pandora, a comic strip in the magazine Kerrang!
 Pandora, a book series from Insel Verlag (1920-1921)
 Pandora, a German science fiction and fantasy magazine

Music

Groups
 Pandora (musical group), a Mexican music group
 The Pandoras, an all-female rock and roll band from Los Angeles, California

Albums
 Pandora (Angela Zhang album), 2006
 Pandora (SiM album), 2013
 Pandora (EP) by Kara, 2012

Songs
 "Pandora", a song by Madina Lake from their album From Them, Through Us, to You
 "Pandora", a song by Róisín Murphy, the B-side of her single "You Know Me Better"
 "Pandora", a song by Parkway Drive from their album Killing with a Smile
 "Pandora (For Cindy)", a song by the Cocteau Twins from their album Treasure (Cocteau Twins album)
 "潘朵拉" (Pandora)", a song by Angela Zhang on Pandora
 "Pandora", a song by SiM on Pandora
 "Pandora", a song by Kara on Pandora

Other uses in music
 Pandora (service), a music streaming service
 Pandora, alternate spelling for the bandora, a stringed musical instrument

Other uses in arts and entertainment, and media
 Pandora (painting), a c. 1896 painting by John William Waterhouse
 Pandora (sculpture), an 1819 marble by Jean-Pierre Cortot
 "Pandora", episode 2.3 of the Gallifrey Doctor Who audio drama series

Biological organisms
Pandora (fungus), a genus of fungi
 Pandora, an invalid name of the butterfly genus Panacea, established by Doubleday around 1848,
Pandora (bivalve), a genus of bivalves in the family Pandoridae
Pandora moth (Coloradia pandora)
 Pandoras, several ray-finned fish species in the genus Pagellus
Symbion pandora, a jug-shaped microscopic aquatic animal
Yucatan brown brocket (Mazama pandora), a small species of deer

Technology
 Pandora (marketplace), a defunct darknet marketplace
 Pandora archive, an online archive run by the National Library of Australia
 Pandora FMS, software for monitoring computer networks
 , several ships of the Royal Navy
 Pandora, a civil transport version of the Argentine DINFIA IA 35 1950s airplane
 Pandora, a HBC vessel operated by the Hudson's Bay Company from 1846–1851
 Pandora, former British car brand

Other uses
 Pandora Papers, a leak of over 11.9 million documents pertaining to offshore finance
 Pandora, a French fashion doll in the 17th and 18th centuries.
 Pandora (jewelry), a global jewelry manufacturing company founded in Denmark
Operation PANDORA, 1971 KGB plan
Pandora, the yearbook of the Washington & Jefferson College, Washington, Pennsylvania

See also
 Pandora Project (disambiguation)
 Pandora's box (disambiguation)
 Pandorica, a prison in the Doctor Who universe